The list of Harvard University people includes notable graduates, professors, and administrators affiliated with Harvard University. For a list of notable non-graduates of Harvard, see notable non-graduate alumni of Harvard. For a list of Harvard's presidents, see President of Harvard University.

Eight Presidents of the United States have graduated from Harvard University: John Adams, John Quincy Adams, Rutherford B. Hayes, John F. Kennedy, Franklin Delano Roosevelt, Theodore Roosevelt, George W. Bush, and Barack Obama. Bush graduated from Harvard Business School, Hayes and Obama from Harvard Law School, and the others from Harvard College.

Over 150 Nobel Prize winners have been associated with the university as alumni, researchers or faculty.

Nobel laureates

Pulitzer Prize winners

Royalty and nobility

Science, technology, medicine, and mathematics

Business

Politics

Law

Supreme Court justices

Other legal figures

Military

Journalism

Literature

Benjamin Kunkel (born 1972), novelist and political economist

Film, theater, and television

Music

Art, architecture, and engineering

 

 Yoram Ben-Porat (1937–1992), Israeli economist and President of the Hebrew University of Jerusalem
 Shlomo Eckstein (1929–2020), Israeli economist and President of Bar-Ilan University
 Amos Eiran, Israeli President of the University of Haifa
 Yosef Tekoah (1925–1991), Ph.D., Israeli President of the Ben-Gurion University of the Negev

Professors and scholars

Faculty

See also
 List of Harvard University non-graduate alumni
 List of companies founded by Harvard University alumni

References

Lists of people by university or college in Massachusetts
People